Butch Creek is a stream in the U.S. state of South Dakota.

Butch Creek has the name of Charles "Butch" Benard, an early settler.

See also
List of rivers of South Dakota

References

Rivers of Jones County, South Dakota
Rivers of Mellette County, South Dakota
Rivers of South Dakota